is a railway station on the Senseki Line in the city of Higashimatsushima, Miyagi Prefecture, Japan, operated by the East Japan Railway Company (JR East).

Lines
Nobiru Station is served by the Senseki Line, and is located 33.4 kilometers from the starting point of the Senseki Line at Aoba-dōri Station. It is also served by trains of the Senseki-Tōhoku Line.

Station layout
The station has one island platform connected to the station building by a level crossing. The station is staffed.

Platforms

History
Nobiru Station opened on April 10, 1928 as a station on the Miyagi Electric Railway. On October 23, 1931, it was renamed . The Miyagi Electric Railway was nationalized on May 1, 1944, and the station name reverted to its present name. The station was absorbed into the JR East network upon the privatization of JNR on April 1, 1987.

The station was closed from March 11, 2011, due to damage to the line associated with the 2011 Tōhoku earthquake and tsunami, and services were replaced by provisional bus services. The station reopened on May 30, 2015, on a higher ground where the former community around the station would be reconstructed. Due to the relocation, the distance from Aoba-Dōri was changed from 34.0 kilometers to 33.4 kilometers.

Passenger statistics
In fiscal 2018, the station was used by an average of 197 passengers daily (boarding passengers only).

Surrounding area
 Nobiru Post Office

See also
 List of railway stations in Japan

References

External links

 

Railway stations in Miyagi Prefecture
Senseki Line
Railway stations in Japan opened in 1928
Higashimatsushima, Miyagi
Stations of East Japan Railway Company
Buildings damaged by the 2011 Tōhoku earthquake and tsunami